Gitte Andersen (born 21 July 1992) is a former Danish handball player and currently assistant coach for Hadsten Håndbold.

References

1989 births
Living people
People from Randers
Danish female handball players
Sportspeople from the Central Denmark Region